Yasmin Perry (born 10 March 1993), who performs under the mononym Yasmin, is an English singer, songwriter and DJ. She is signed to record label Levels Entertainment, an imprint of Ministry of Sound and began her singing career in October 2010 when she appeared on rapper Devlin's single "Runaway". Her debut single, "On My Own", was released on 30 January 2011.

Career

Early history
Yasmin was born on 10 March 1993 in Ashington, England to an Iranian father and English mother. She was raised in Northumberland and also lived in Manchester and Kilmacolm, near Glasgow in Scotland.

Yasmin began her musical career when she was seventeen years old. She left university, moving to London, where she focused on DJing. During her time in London, Yasmin was spotted and asked to DJ for many artists, including N*E*R*D, POB and Taio Cruz.

Breakthrough (2009–present)
Throughout September and October 2010, Yasmin supported British rapper Example on his headline tour of the United Kingdom, alongside Devlin and singer-songwriter Ed Sheeran. Yasmin was then featured on Devlin's second official single, "Runaway", for which Yasmin wrote and provided vocals for the chorus. The single was released in the United Kingdom on 24 October 2010, where it debuted at number 15 on the UK Singles Chart, peaking at number 18 in Scotland and number 48 in Europe.

Following the success of the single, Yasmin was signed to Levels Entertainment. She released her debut single "On My Own" through Ministry of Sound in the United Kingdom on 30 January 2011; where it debuted at number 39 on the UK Singles Chart. Her second solo release, "Finish Line" produced by Labrinth, was released on 8 May 2011.

She premiered her next single, "Light Up (The World)" which features Ms Dynamite at The Wickerman Festival in Scotland on 22 July 2011.

Yasmin supported Ellie Goulding on her Halcyon UK tour. She featured on Gorgon City's breakthrough single "Real", taken from their debut album Sirens (2014). Yasmin has also collaborated with the likes of Major Lazer, Bloc Party frontman Kele Okereke and emerging house artist Friend Within.

Discography

Singles

As featured artist

Other appearances

References

1988 births
Living people
English people of Iranian descent
English DJs
English women singer-songwriters
Women DJs
Musicians from Manchester
People from Ashington
People from Renfrewshire
Electronic dance music DJs
21st-century English women singers
21st-century English singers
English women in electronic music